Jakub Miśkowiak (born on 3 August 2001) is an international speedway rider from Poland.

Speedway career 
In 2021, Miśkowiak won the gold medal at the Team Junior World Championship with Wiktor Lampart and then won the World Under 21 Championship after winning two of the three rounds.

In 2022, he won the bronze medal at the World Under-21 Championship in the 2022 SGP2 and won the 2022 World U-21 Team  Championship.

Family
His uncle is former Polish international speedway rider Robert Miśkowiak.

References 

Living people
2001 births
Polish speedway riders
People from Wschowa